OWLS is a mnemonic used by general aviation airplane pilots to assess an unprepared surface for a precautionary landing.

Like all mnemonics this check has become part of aviation culture and folklore.

OWLS:

 Obstacles
 Wind direction
 Length of surface
 Surface condition and type

References

Aviation mnemonics